Sultan Mansur Shah ibni Almarhum Sultan Muzaffar Shah (died 1477) was the sixth Sultan of Malacca from 1459 to 1477. He ascended the throne after the death of his father, Muzaffar Shah.

Expansions
Mansur Shah implemented a policy of expansionism during his rule. Many territories in Peninsular Malaysia and eastern Sumatra and the surrounding islands, such as Perak, Bernam, while Siak became Malacca's vassal. Several states unsuccessfully asserted their autonomy such as Pahang, Kampar and Inderagiri. This led one of Mansur's son to be leader of Pahang. Manjung, Rupat, Singapore, and Bintan, were under the control of Malacca during his rule.

Marriage alliances
Mansur Shah also used marriage alliances between princesses of Malacca and the rulers of conquered states, such as the marriage between the king of Siak to Mansur Shah's daughter, Princess Mahadewi, to strengthen Malacca’s control over those states. Such alliances were a factor in Islam's expansion in maritime Southeast Asia. Siantan and Indragiri in Sumatra were also given to Malacca as dowry for his marriage to the princess of Majapahit. 

According to historian Tomé Pires, Princess Hang Li Po, daughter of the Ming Dynasty Emperor Yongle (1403–1424), was sent over with her sizable entourage to marry Sultan Mansur Shah. Princess Hang Li Po remains a mystery/myth today because there are no records in Ming Dynasty sources with the surname of Hang or a princess named Li Po. Emperor Yongle had only 5 princesses, Princess Yong'an (永安公主; 1377–1417), Princess Ancheng (安成公主; 1384–1443), Princess Yongping (永平公主; 1379–1444), Princess Xianning (咸寧公主; 1385–1440) and Princess Changning (常寧公主; 1387–1408). During Sultan Mansur's reign of power, the Emperor of the Ming Dynasty was Emperor Yingzong (1457–1464), instead of Emperor Yongle. 

Princesses of conquered states, such as Princess Wanang Seri of Pahang and Raden Galoh Candra Kirana, were also married to the Sultan of Malacca.

Economic policy
Mansur Shah reduced taxes on trade items during his reign, which increased the interest of merchants in trading through Malacca. A preferential tariff system was introduced whereby a 6% tax was levied on the trade of merchants from west of Malacca, such as Arabia and India, and a 3% tax was levied on the trade of merchants from Maritime Southeast Asia. Merchants from China, Japan and Java were not taxed at all. Malacca also offered the economic advantage of easy access to laborers.

Spread of Islam
Mansur Shah, who had an interest in Islam, encouraged scholarship in Islamic theological studies, and studied Sufism himself. He studied under Maulana Abu Bakar, who brought the Ab Darul Manzum scriptures to Malacca. He ordered the translation of the scripture to Malay by Makhdum Patakan. Mansur Shah referred to scholars from Pasai on religious issues due to their expertise.

References

1477 deaths
Sultans of Malacca
History of Malacca
15th-century monarchs in Asia